"#1 Crush" is a song by the American  rock band Garbage, released internationally as a b-side to their debut single "Vow" (1995), and in the United Kingdom on the b-side to second single "Subhuman" (1995).

In 1996, Nellee Hooper and Marius de Vries remixed "#1 Crush" for the soundtrack to Baz Luhrmann's modernised Romeo + Juliet film adaptation.  In addition to downplaying the guitars and reworking the percussion and synth elements of the song, Hooper added a distorted vocal sample from Madonna's 1995 single "Bedtime Story". The remix of "#1 Crush" was released in March 1997 and went to number one on the Billboard Modern Rock Tracks chart, where it stayed for four weeks, and is Garbage's sole number-one entry on any US singles chart. "#1 Crush" was the first of two hit singles from the Romeo + Juliet soundtrack.

Song information
"#1 Crush" was written and recorded between March 1994 and May 1995 during sessions between band members Duke Erikson, Shirley Manson, Steve Marker and Butch Vig in either Marker's basement recording studio or at their own Smart Studios in Madison. Manson was concerned that listeners wouldn't realise that the song was about a stalker: "It's about somebody who wasn't quite right. The song however were slightly autobiographical. Everybody's felt obsessive about something or somebody in their life. I've felt crazy about somebody before," she explained, "That feeling - usually when you've split up with somebody - when you're absolutely obsessed with what they are doing. It's all to do with being pathetic". "#1 Crush" was slated for inclusion on Garbage, until Almo Sounds co-founder Jerry Moss called his label manager worried that the song might end up "a suicide note". Garbage themselves didn't think the song was particularly strong, Erikson remembering "the lyrics were a bit over the top". Reflecting on the lyrics, Manson felt, "All real love is a form of obsession. If you love someone more than anything else, that degree of exclusivity requires an abnormal amount of passion and care. And that can be positive," contrasting with the protagonist of "#1 Crush, "It's just that keeping it short of unhealthy, short of violence, really requires a bit of moderation. You can't let something like that take over all of your thought processes". Butch Vig later described "#1 Crush" as "disturbing".

In August 1995, "#1 Crush" was released on the b-side of Garbage's singles "Vow" (in Europe, South Africa and Australasia) and "Subhuman" (in the United Kingdom). Both "Subhuman" and "#1 Crush" were included as bonus tracks on the Japanese release of Garbage (titled G in Japan).

Remix Release and commercial performance

Early in 1996, Garbage's manager Shannon O'Shea pitched "#1 Crush" to 20th Century Fox for inclusion on the Romeo + Juliet movie. The song was received enthusiastically by Fox; however Almo were dead set against the sync opportunity as the soundtrack would be released on another label, Capitol. After months of negotiation, Almo finally agreed. By this time, Garbage had scored two big hits in the US ("Only Happy When It Rains" and "Stupid Girl") and had broken through into the mainstream. The promotions team at Capitol planned to release the Garbage track first and then follow it up with a second song from the soundtrack: The Cardigans "Lovefool". Almo were concerned that "#1 Crush" was competing with the last single releases from the debut album: "Supervixen" had just been released to alternative radio and "Milk" to adult radio formats. Almo had already pressed CDs and cassettes for the physical release of "Milk", and refused to give Capitol single rights. No commercial single for "#1 Crush" could be made available in stores, therefore the song would be ineligible for the Hot 100. Capitol's promo rep was keen, however, for Garbage to shoot a music video for the song.

The soundtrack album for Romeo + Juliet was released in North America on October 29, 1996, a few days ahead of the movie itself which opened-wide in cinemas on November 1; "#1 Crush" was placed as the album opener. O'Shea had already gave a couple of radio stations the jump by providing early copies of the track on hastily burned CDRs. "#1 Crush" quickly got added to 22 station playlists, even though "Supervixen" was officially the current Garbage single and still increasing in airplay. The following week, "#1 Crush" was the Most Added track at alternative radio, eclipsing "Supervixen" by adding a further 38 stations, while "Supervixen" gained none. The Romeo + Juliet OST debuted at #44 on the Billboard 200. The quick pick up at radio meant that "#1 Crush" debuted at #17 on the Modern Rock Tracks chart and #49 on the Hot 100 Airplay chart; "Supervixen" quickly lost traction as "#1 Crush" soared ahead, gaining more station adds and almost tripling its weekly play total. At this time, Almo was still refusing to support the single and were now focused on servicing "Milk".

By December, the soundtrack album had shot up to #12; Billboard declared that "#1 Crush" has become "the driving force behind the [Romeo + Juliet OST]" as it broke into the Modern Rock top ten. Due to the song's runaway success, Garbage contemplated filming a music video for it at the end of their touring commitments. Almo had reluctantly agreed to get behind "#1 Crush" after Geffen executives put pressure on the label to do so. "Milk" didn't even chart. On the first week of January 1997, "#1 Crush" peaked at #29 on the Hot 100 Airplay chart as it hit the #1 spot on the Modern Rock chart. The song would spend the next four weeks at the summit. The Romeo + Juliet OST eventually hit #2 on the albums chart; while Garbage rebounded from the lower-70s into the top 50. By the end of its chart-run, "#1 Crush" had spent a total of sixteen weeks on the Hot 100 Airplay chart and twenty-two on the Modern Rock chart. Erikson later recalled: "Turns out we didn't even need a video."

From March through May 1997, Romeo + Juliet opened in cinemas throughout Europe. In April, Mushroom serviced "#1 Crush" to European radio, where it placed on Music & Medias Most Added list, and re-released the debut album bundled with a bonus "#1 Crush" CD single.

In 2007, the remix of "#1 Crush" was remastered for both Garbage's greatest hits album Absolute Garbage and Romeo + Juliet: Music from the Motion Picture (10th Anniversary Edition), and in 2012, it was included in the band's second greatest hits album The Absolute Collection released in Oceania. In 2015, an early demo mix of "#1 Crush", was included as a previously unreleased bonus track on Garbage (20th Anniversary Super Deluxe Edition) along with new remasters of the original version and the remix. The same year, The Absolute Collection was remastered for iTunes where the "#1 Crush" remix was replaced with the original version. In 2022, the remix was remastered again and included in the band's third greatest hits album Anthology.

Critical reception
"#1 Crush" generated a mostly positive response from music critics and radio programmers. Don O'Neal, PD of KFRR in Fresno, California, praised Garbage for following up the mass-appeal crossover "Stupid Girl" with the "almost gothic" "#1 Crush". "#1 Crush" was nominated for Best Song from a Movie at the 1997 MTV Movie Awards.

Media appearances

Aside from Romeo + Juliet, "#1 Crush" has become an enduring work for the band, featuring in multiple media since and has also covered by multiple artists. In 2004, the original version of "#1 Crush" became the theme tune to the British sci-fi drama Hex. The song was also licensed for episodes of the shows La Femme Nikita and True Blood and is performed by a character in the series Shameless and movie Soldier's Girl. In 2022, the remix was used in episode 7 of the second season of American Horror Stories.

Credits and personnelGarbage Shirley Manson – vocals, guitar
 Steve Marker – guitars, bass, samples and loops
 Duke Erikson – guitars, keyboards, six-string and fuzz bass
 Butch Vig – drums, loops, noise and efxPublishing Written by Garbage
 Copyright 1995 Vibecrusher Music / Irving Music, Inc (BMI) / Deadarm Music (ASCAP)Production Recorded & produced by Garbage
 Recorded at Smart Studios in Madison, Wisconsin, USA
 Second engineer: Mike Zirkel
 Mastered: Howie Weinberg (Masterdisk)
 Editing & post production: Scott Hull (Masterdisk)"#1 Crush (Remix)"'
 Remix and additional production: Nellee Hooper
 Additional programming: Marius de Vries
 Mix engineer: Jim Abbiss

Charts

Weekly charts

Year-end charts

See also
 List of Billboard number-one alternative singles of 1997

References

External links

 Official Garbage website
 "#1 Crush" lyrics

1997 singles
Capitol Records singles
Garbage (band) songs
Mushroom Records singles
Song recordings produced by Butch Vig
1995 songs
Songs written by Shirley Manson
Songs written by Duke Erikson
Songs written by Steve Marker
Songs written by Butch Vig